Carl Henry Kaeppel MC BA (13 January 1887 – 6 December 1946), generally referred to as Carl Kaeppel, was an Australian scholar of Classical languages and geography.

History
Kaeppel was born at Nattai near Mittagong, New South Wales, a son of (Carl William) Herbert Kaeppel (c. 1855 – 22 January 1888) and Emily Annette Kaeppel, née Edwards ( – 12 August 1927).
His father died when Kaeppel was one year old.

Kaeppel was educated at Sydney Grammar School of which he was captain in 1905, and at Sydney University, where he graduated BA with first-class honours in Classics in 1910, having won the Salting exhibition, Cooper scholarship, and Cooper travelling scholarship, which entitled him to go to Oxford, but illness prevented him from taking up the opportunity but was able to undertake a long tour of Europe, studying languages.
He returned to Australia, serving as a master at Sydney Grammar School ("Shore"), North Sydney for some years, then at The Armidale School, Armidale.

He enlisted with First AIF in January 1916 and in mid-March as Lieut. Kaeppel left to serve overseas with the 18th Battalion. He was promoted captain and adjutant, was mentioned in dispatches and won the Military Cross.

He worked at the British Museum on early geographic texts, and did a course in anthropology at London University under Professor Seligman.

Kaeppel travelled extensively in Europe and learned eleven languages, but was no polyglot.

He returned  to Australia, where by 1922 he had been appointed senior classics master at Melbourne Grammar School by headmaster R. P. Franklin, a close friend (they had taught together at "Shore") but in 1931 was forced to leave on account of his heavy drinking. He moved to Sydney, where he survived by tutoring privately.

Kaeppel engaged in research on Classical geography and anthropology, and articles based on this work, read before the Classical Association of Victoria, were published as Off the Beaten Track in the Classics in 1936.
He converted to the Roman Catholic faith in that same year, and devoted the last years of his life to Catholic education, teaching at Marist Brothers' High School, Darlinghurst (280–296 Liverpool Street, since demolished), and St Vincent's College, Potts Point. 
He edited a regular page on education for The Catholic Weekly.

He died in Lewisham Private Hospital, aged 59. Requiem Mass was celebrated at St Canice's Church, Darlinghurst, and his remains were buried in Waverley Cemetery.

Personal
Kaeppel married Muriel Beatrice Bailie  on 8 January 1916. She left him while he was overseas and they were divorced in 1920.

Character
Kaeppel was described as a lovable character, loyal and trustworthy, who loved knowledge for its own sake. 
He was a voracious reader, and not only retained all he read but could cross-reference that information and draw inferences and reach surprising conclusions from the mass of mental data. He carried in his head the makings of a multitude of books, though he only ever completed one or two. Despite being unable to pronounce an "R", so that "Greek" came out "Gweek", he was a welcome conversationalist and a writer and speaker to a range of subjects on ABC radio. An habitué of the Savage and Naval and Military clubs, he was a hard drinker, generous to a fault, completely devoid of worldly ambition and died virtually penniless and (perhaps hastened from being gassed during the War) before his time.

Recognition
Thanks to an anonymous benefaction, annual prizes for study in the classics, known as the Carl Kaeppel Memorial Prize, were instituted at the Marist Brothers' High School, Darlinghurst.

Publications

 Used by State Education Departments.

References

External links
Kaeppel at the Australian War Memorial

Australian educators
Australian classical scholars
1887 births
1946 deaths
Australian recipients of the Military Cross